This is the discography of Japanese female group Kalafina.

Albums

Studio albums

Extended plays

Compilation albums

Live albums

Other albums

Singles

DVD & Blu-ray Releases

Music videos

Other appearances

References

Discographies of Japanese artists